Christianity is the largest religion in Nauru, with Nauru Congregational Church being the largest denomination, encompassing 35.71% of the population as of the 2011 census. Freedom of religion is a constitutional right, and the country's laws and society uphold this right without any significant breaches.

Demographics 
According to the 2002 census, approximately two-thirds of Christians are Protestant, and the remainder are Catholic. The largest denomination is the Nauru Congregational Church. The ethnic Chinese on the island, approximately 3 to 4 percent of the population, may be Confucian, Buddhist, Taoist, Christian, or nonreligious. The largely Christian communities of Tuvaluan and I-Kiribati expatriates were repatriated in late 2006 following the near cessation of phosphate mining in the country. The Jehovah's Witnesses said they had small numbers of followers among the native population. The Church of Jesus Christ of Latter-day Saints (LDS Church) reported 126 members in a single congregation in Nauru.

Nauruan indigenous religion was the predominant religion in Nauru before the late nineteenth and early twentieth centuries, when foreign missionaries introduced Christianity to the island. There are a few active Christian missionary organisations, including representatives of Anglicanism, Methodism, and Catholicism.

According to data from Pew Research, the religions of Hinduism, Judaism, and Islam had a small presence in the island, with about 0.1% of the population (fewer than ten people), adhering to each faith. With the exception of detainees in Nauru Regional Processing Centre, in which majority are Muslims, with significant minority of Buddhists and Hindus, although the population were slowly decreasing due to re-settlement program by the Australian Government.

Religious freedom 
The constitution of Nauru establishes the freedom of conscience and expression, although it provides that these rights may be limited by any law which is "reasonably required".

Religious groups are required to register with the government in order to proselytize, build houses of worship, hold religious services, or officiate marriages. As of 2014, religious groups are required to have 750 members to register. According to local religious leaders, in practice the only activity which is restricted for unregistered groups is marriage officiation.

Religious groups are allowed to operate private schools. In public schools, religious groups are allowed to provide religious studies courses once a week during school hours. Students are expected to attend courses pertaining to their chosen religious denomination; other students are expected to use the time as an independent study period.

According to a 2017 US government report, there are no significant societal limits on religious freedom in Nauru. In the past, some elements of the Nauru Protestant and Roman Catholic communities have occasionally voiced discomfort with religious groups they perceived as foreign, in particular the LDS Church and the Jehovah's Witnesses.

See also
 Catholic Church in Nauru
 The Church of Jesus Christ of Latter-day Saints in Nauru
 The Church of Jesus Christ of Latter-day Saints in Micronesia (disambiguation) for the LDS Church elsewhere in Micronesia.

References